Heart 100.7 may refer to:
 Heart North East in Teesside and North Yorkshire
 Heart West Midlands in Birmingham and the West Midlands